This is a list of Estonian television related events from 1986.

Events

Debuts

Television shows

Ending this year

Births
19 April - Henrik Kalmet, actor
18 November - Ragne Veensalu, actress

Deaths